The Bucegi Natural Park is a protected area (natural park category V IUCN) situated in Romania, in the administrative territory of counties Brașov, Dâmbovița and Prahova.

Location 
The Natural Park is located in the south-central part of Romania, in the Bucegi Mountains of the Southern Carpathians.

Description 
The Bucegi Natural Park with an area of 32.663 ha was declared a protected area by Law Number 5 of March 6, 2000 (published in Monitorul Oficial Number 152 of April 12, 2000) and represents a mountainous area (caves, pit caves, canyons, ridges, sinkholes, valleys, waterfalls, pastures and forests), that shelters a variety of flora and fauna. The park is famous for its Babele and Sphinx features.

Habitats 
Beech forests, bushes, alpine limestone grasslands, alpine rivers and herbaceous vegetation, mountain hay meadows, springs, limestone rocky slopes and seminatural dry grasslands.

Natural reserves 
Protected areas included in the park: Abruptul Mălăiești - Bucșoiu - Gaura (1.634 ha) and Locul fosilifer Vama Strunga in Brașov County; Cocora Cave and Cheile Urșilor (307 ha) in Dâmbovița County; and Abruptul Prahovean Bucegi (3.478 ha) and Colții lui Barbeș Mountains (1.513 ha) in Prahova County.

References 

Protected areas of Romania
Geography of Brașov County
Geography of Dâmbovița County
Geography of Prahova County
Tourist attractions in Brașov County
Tourist attractions in Dâmbovița County
Tourist attractions in Prahova County
Protected areas established in 1974